1901 in philosophy

Events 
 Sully Prudhomme was awarded the 1901 Nobel Prize in Literature "in special recognition of his poetic composition, which gives evidence of lofty idealism, artistic perfection and a rare combination of the qualities of both heart and intellect".

Publications 
 Émile Boutmy, Essai d'une psychologie politique du peuple anglais au XIXe siècle
 Rudolf Christoph Eucken, Der Wahrheitsgehalt der Religion
 H. G. Wells, Anticipations of the Reaction of Mechanical and Scientific Progress Upon Human Life and Thought

Births 
 January 3 - Eric Voegelin (died 1985)
 April 13 - Jacques Lacan (died 1981)
 May 23 - Charles W. Morris (died 1979)
 June 16 - Henri Lefebvre (died 1991)
 November 3 - André Malraux (died 1976)
 December 5 - Werner Heisenberg (died 1976)

Deaths

References 

Philosophy
20th-century philosophy
Philosophy by year